Walter Nyamilandu Manda (born 11 November 1971) is a Malawian sports administrator and former player. He currently serves as the president of the Malawian Football Association retaining the prominent role since 2004 and he previously served as an Executive Member of FIFA's General Council.

Nyamilandu represented Malawi by participating in the 1998 FIFA World Cup Qualifiers.  He was president of the Football Association of Malawi for a world record 17 years. Nyamilandu claimed victory in the 2003, 2007, 2011, 2015 and 2019 FAM General Elections.  He assured Malawi's return to the African Cup of Nation's continental tournament twice during his tenure as president. Before taking up his role, Malawi had struggled to qualify for over 20 years. He was the first Malawian in history and one of a few Africans to be elected onto the prestigious governing body, FIFA as an Executive Council member. Nyamilandu beat the president of the South African Football Association in a series of voting rounds to attain the council seat.

References

External links
 
https://www.instagram.com/p/CKD24XQBk3j/

1971 births
Living people
Malawian footballers
Malawi international footballers
Association football central defenders
Mighty Wanderers FC players